Ursula Andkjær Olsen (born 1970) is a Danish poet. She has published a dozen poetry collections, two of which have been translated into English and published as Third-Millenium Heart (2017) and Outgoing Vessel (2021).

Olsen is one of Denmark's most prominent and critically acclaimed contemporary poets. In 2017, the Danish Arts Foundation's judging panel said, in giving Olsen its Award of Distinction, "Few poets, if any, have renewed Danish poetry in the 21st century the way Ursula Andkjær Olsen has done it."

Early life and education 
Olsen was born in 1970 in Copenhagen, and she grew up in the capital.

She holds a master's degree in musicology and philosophy from the University of Copenhagen and the Technical University of Berlin. Early in her career, she worked for several years as a music critic for Berlingske and other newspapers.

Writing

Poetry 
Olsen made her literary debut in 2000 with the polyphonic poetry book Lulus sange og taler. She went on to publish nearly a dozen more poetry collections.

Her 2005 collection Ægteskabet mellem vejen og udvejen attracted significant critical acclaim and became a turning point in her career. Then, 2008's Havet er en scene was nominated for the 2009 Nordic Council Literature Prize.

Though she was not selected, the following year Olsen received the Otto Gelsted Prize, and the year after she won the Holberg Medal for her overall body of work up to that point. She later received the Montanaprisen Award in 2013 for Det 3. årtusindes hjerte, described as a "polyphonic 214-page poem." She was subsequently given the Danish Critics' Prize for Literature in 2015 for Udgående Fartøj, sometimes described as a sequel to or, in Olsen's words, "a dark twin" of Det 3. årtusindes hjerte. In 2017, the Danish Arts Foundation gave her its Award of Distinction. Most recently, Olsen's 2020 poetry collection Mit smykkeskrin was nominated in 2021 for the Nordic Council Literature Prize.

Her works Det 3. årtusindes hjerte and Udgående Fartøj have been translated into English under the titles Third-Millennium Heart and Outgoing Vessel, respectively, by Katrine Øgaard Jensen. Third-Millenium Heart won the 2018 National Translation Award for Poetry. Outgoing Vessel was scheduled for publication in March 2021.

As a poet, Olsen is considered part of the ecopoetry and ecofeminist movements.

In 2013, she became the editor of the journal Critique.

Other projects 
Olsen has also written one novel, Krisehæfterne: Pandora Blue Box, Atlantissyndromet, which was published in 2017.

Her work also includes several theatrical pieces, as well as libretti for operas. Among her libretti are those for Pelle Gudmundsen-Holmgreen's Sol går op, sol går ned and Peter Bruun's Miki Alone, the latter of which received the 2008 Nordic Council Music Prize.

Selected works

Poetry 

 Lulus sange og taler, 2000
 Atlas over huller i verden, 2003 (poetry and prose)
 Ægteskabet mellem vejen og udvejen, 2005
 Skønheden hænger på træerne, 2006
 Havet er en scene, 2008
 Have og helvede, 2010
 SAMLET, 2011 (poems written from 2000–2010)
 Det 3. årtusindes hjerte, 2012
 Den bedste af alle verdener, 2014
 Udgående fartøj, 2015
 Vi rus salve, 2016
 Mit smykkeskrin, 2020

Novel 

 Krisehæfterne: Pandora Blue Box, Atlantissyndromet, 2017

English translations 

 Third-Millenium Heart (2017)
 Outgoing Vessel (2021)

References 

1970 births
Danish women poets
Danish women novelists
Danish women dramatists and playwrights
Danish music critics
People from Copenhagen
Living people